Kohlu-ye Sofla (also Romanized as Kohlū-ye Soflá; also known as Kahloo, Kohlū Pā’īn, Kohlūy, Kohlū-ye Pā’īn, and Koholū) is a village in Rudbar Rural District, in the Central District of Tafresh County, Markazi Province, Iran. At the 2006 census, its population was 285, in 106 families.

References 

Populated places in Tafresh County